Great Battle may refer to:
War of Wrath, or the Great Battle, the final war against Morgoth at the end of the First Age in J.R.R. Tolkien's legendarium
The Great Battle (video game series), video games series in Compati Hero Series
The Great Battle (film), 2018 South Korean film